The Order of the Red Star is a national award of many former communist states during the Cold War. They get their name from the original Soviet award of the same name:

 Order of the Red Star (Soviet Union)
 Order of the Red Star (Albania)
 Order of the Red Star (Czechoslovakia)
 Order of the Red Star (Bukharan People's Soviet Republic)

See also 

 Order of the Red Banner